Diotisalvi Neroni (1401 – 4 August 1482) was an Italian politician. He wrote Florentina Syndicatus.

References 

1401 births
1482 deaths
Ambassadors of the Republic of Florence
Italian politicians
Burials at Santa Maria sopra Minerva
15th-century people of the Republic of Florence